Following are the units and commanders involved in the Hainan Island Operation, fought 10 February 1939 as part of a campaign by the Empire of Japan during the Second Sino-Japanese War to blockade the Guangdong mainland of the Republic of China and prevent it from communicating with the outside world and from receiving imports of much-needed arms and materials.

Japan 

Hainan Conquest Forces
Vice Admiral Kondō Nobutake

Ground 
 4th Base Force
 Yokosuka 4th SNLF 
 Kure 6th SNLF 
 Sasebo 8th SNLF 
 5th Garrison Unit 
 Taiwan Mixed Brigade
 Major Gen. Iida
 Taiwan 1st Infantry Regiment 
 Taiwan 2nd Infantry Regiment 
 Taiwan Mountain Gun Regiment

Naval 
 Cruisers
 1 Myoko-class heavy cruiser (10 × 8-in. main battery, 16 × 24-in. torpedo tubes, 33.75 knots) 
 Myoko (flagship)
 2 Nagara-class light cruisers (7 × 5.5-in. main battery, 8 × 24-in. torpedo tubes, 36 knots) 
 Nagara
 Natori
 23rd Destroyer Group 
 4 Mutsuki-class destroyers (4 × 4.7-in. main battery, 6 × Type 12 torpedo tubes, 37.25 knots)
 Mochizuki, Mutsuki, 
 28th Destroyer Group 
 2 Kamikaze (1922)-class destroyers (4 × 4.7-in. main battery, 6 × 21-in. torpedo tubes, 37.25 knots)
 Yūnagi, Asanagi 
 45th Destroyer Group 
 2 Kamikaze (1905)-class destroyers (2 × 12-pdr. main battery, 2 × 18-in. torpedo tubes, 29 knots)
 ,  
 12th Minesweeper Group 
 1st Air Sentai 
 1 fleet carrier: Akagi
 1 light carrier: Chiyoda 
 1st Air Unit 
 14th Kōkūtai
 16th Kōkūtai

China 
Defense of Hainan
Wang Yi
 5th Security Brigade – Wang Yi 
 2 Security Regiments – About 1,600 men 
 7 Guard Battalions (newly formed from residents) – 1,750 men 
 Communist Independent Battalion – 300 men 
 Xiuying Battery Garrisons (still undergoing organization) – 250 men

Sources 

Hainan Island
Hainan Island